is a 1982 Japanese anime science fiction war film directed by Toshio Masuda and Tomoharu Katsumata.

Partially inspired by the speculative war novel The Third World War: The Untold Story by General Sir John Hackett, the movie's plot is focused on a World War III set in the later part of the 1980s, with the digit X denoting the specific year the war breaks out.

Plot

On 16 September of an unspecified year in the 1980s, the United States conducts an orbital test of the new Space Ranger antimissile laser defense system. American scientist Burt Gains oversees the test under the aegis of the Defense Advanced Research Projects Agency with the target warhead being launched from Vandenberg Air Force Base as the international media covers it. After the Space Ranger module successfully destroys the warhead, the crew of the Space Voyager shuttle carrying the module returns to worldwide adulation. Gains looks at the successful test as a sign that nuclear war can be prevented but has reservations about its potential to inflame the nuclear arms race. His sister Laura and his best friend Wataru Mikumo soon find out that he was kidnapped by Soviet spies while heading off to work. A Soviet Alfa-class submarine is tasked to transport Burt to Vladivostok. Seeing the danger of Burt forced to replicate his Space Ranger work for the Soviets, US President Gibson orders the submarine to be sunk. After a failed earlier attempt by S-3 Vikings to attack the Alfa, a P-3 Orion from Midway Island sinks it with a nuclear torpedo. 

Tension builds up between the US and the USSR in the wake of the sinking, with President Gibson attempting a peaceful solution with the Soviets, who promptly put their forces in Eastern Europe on high alert. Wataru is promoted to lead the Space Ranger research team as Laura is medically confined due to depression over her brother's death.

On Christmas Eve, the Soviets get the news that an elite Soviet Air Force pilot has defected, flying the USSR's most advanced strike aircraft, the 'Black Dragon', to a West German Air Force base in West Germany. Fearful of NATO acquiring Black Dragon's technology, the Soviets launch a Spetsnaz commando using an An-12 raid to kill the pilot and destroy the plane, leaving a wake of devastation in the process. NATO forces are then ordered to counterattack, leading to war. The Soviets and the Warsaw Pact forces go into battle. After days of fighting they easily blast their way across West Germany and the Low Countries, eventually capturing Paris.

The Soviets keep up the offensive, with attacks on Iran, Turkey, and the other parts of the Middle East to capture oil resources while launching airstrikes with Tu-22M2s on Japan due to Japan supporting NATO forces. China joins the war as well at first on the side of the Soviets and invades Taiwan, Hong Kong, and South Korea. However disagreements over which nation will control Japan and racial tensions lead to fighting between Soviet and PLA forces who then attack the USSR's Far East region. US forces invade Cuba and Nicaragua. Soviet First Deputy Premier Kutuzov convenes the Politburo on Premier Orlov's behalf and proposes a ceasefire to secure oil rights to the Middle East while plotting to arrest Defense Minister Bulgarin, who earlier pushed Orlov to go to war. However, Bulgarin appears and has the entire Politburo arrested by Soviet forces that are loyal to him.

A Soviet Navy ballistic missile submarine receives orders to launch on the US, but comes under attack from the US Navy and sustains heavy damage. Waiting for a recall order from Premier Orlov himself, the submarine captain refuses to launch the missiles, but with the sub rapidly sinking, his executive officer kills him and completes the launch with his communications officer. Several US cities are destroyed in the attack and President Gibson authorizes a limited nuclear counterstrike. Bulgarin launches a second strike while one of his assistants kills Orlov as he tries to negotiate peace with Gibson over the hotline. The Soviet attack hits more US and allied cities, with casualties estimated at 20 million. Gibson learns that Vandenberg is still safe and authorizes the Space Ranger's deployment with Wataru sent up as well. Meanwhile, survivors in the war zones begin a peace movement together with deserting soldiers. When Bulgarin learns that the deserters include Soviet and Warsaw Pact troops, outraged that his forces are abandoning the Soviet cause he prepares to launch all remaining Soviet nuclear missiles, but Kutuzov reappears in a bid to force him to stop. Bulgarin is killed, but not before he presses the launch button with the override canceled.

Word of the new strike inbound reaches Gibson and the Space Ranger forces, with four modules in orbit to stop the warheads. While the satellites destroy many MIRV warheads, three are destroyed by the Soviets' killer satellite network and one warhead severely damages the fourth and the Space Voyager shuttle. Wataru decides to head to the last remaining satellite and repair it ahead of another wave of MIRVs before his oxygen runs out. The module is repaired and Wataru shoots down seven MIRVs but is forced to maneuver the satellite to get close and shoot down the eighth bearing down on Los Angeles, but the blast shakes him loose from the module and out into space. Laura, who was evacuated to the US after being caught in the Soviet airstrikes on Japan, flies in another shuttle to save Wataru while Kutuzov orders the crew of a nearby Soviet space station to rescue him. A ceasefire is declared by both forces and both sides agree to work together to help rebuild the damaged world.

Cast
 Kin'ya Kitaōji as Mikumo Wataru
 Masako Natsume as Laura Gains
 Keiichi Noda as Professor Brown
 Hidekatsu Shibata as Burt Gains and narrator of the trailer
 Yoshio Kaneuchi as President Gibson
 Osamu Kobayashi as Secretary of State Girard
 Tamio Ōki as Chairman of the Joint Chiefs of Staff McCoy
 Masashi Amenomori as General Secretary Orlov
 Yōichi Miyakawa as First Deputy Premier Kutuzov
 Takeshi Aono as Minister of Defense Bugarin
 Chikao Otsuka as Lieutenant Colonel Stroganov
 Yasuo Tanaka as Koiso
 Gorō Naya as JSDF Commanding General Tōno

Production
Toei made the film with the assistance of former JSDF Major General Iwano Masataka. It created a controversy when it was alleged that the film was frightening children with the depicted threat of the Soviet Union. Production was boycotted by the Toei Animation Company labor union, which was joined by more than thirty organizations. These included the Mothers Association of Japan and the Teachers Union in Tokyo.

A 90-minute cut of the film was released on VHS in Australia by Wizard Video. This version was not a full English dub, but instead retained Japanese dialogue while providing an English voice-over summary of the plot.  It also featured music by Tangerine Dream, Asia and Rush. The original Japanese version was 125 minutes long, with a German-language release of 115 minutes.

References

External links
 
 
 Review at Anime-games.co.uk
Future War 198X, Japanese language with English subtitles
Future War 198X, German language dub

1982 anime films
1980s science fiction war films
Fiction set in the 1980s
Films about World War III
Soviet Union war fiction
Films about space warfare
Adventure anime and manga
Japanese animated science fiction films
Japanese war films
Toei Animation films
Military of the United States in fiction
Japan Self-Defense Forces in fiction
Films about nuclear war and weapons
Films directed by Tomoharu Katsumata
1980s Japanese-language films